Bicycle Route 1 may refer to:

Denmark
Danish national bicycle route 1

United States
U.S. Bicycle Route 1
Delaware Bicycle Route 1
Claire Saltonstall Bikeway, also known as Bike Route 1